British Library, Add MS 14462, designated by number 92 on the list of Wright, is a Syriac manuscript of the New Testament, according to the Peshitta version, on parchment. Palaeographically it has been assigned to the 6th century.

Description 

It contains the text of the first two Gospels according to the Peshitta version, on 106 leaves (8⅞ by 5⅛ inches), with some lacunae. The number of quires is now 14. The writing is in two columns per page, 21-27 lines per page. The writing is in fine and regular Estrangela. The manuscript was written by two hands (1-68 recto and 68 verso-106). Some lessons are rubricated, but only in the Gospel of Mark.

The text is divided according to the Ammonian Sections, with references to the Eusebian Canons. There is a harmony of the four Gospels at the food of each page.

There is a note on folio 68 recto "I, Nonnus have written".

The manuscript was brought from the covenant of St. Mary Deipara. It was described by William Aldis Wright.

The manuscript is housed at the British Library (Add MS 14462) in London.

See also 

 List of the Syriac New Testament manuscripts
 Syriac versions of the Bible
 British Library, Add MS 14454
 British Library, Add MS 14457

References

Further reading 

 William Wright, Catalogue of the Syriac manuscripts in the British Museum (London: British Museum, 1870), pp. 64–65.

Peshitta manuscripts
6th-century biblical manuscripts
Add. 14462